Claudius Xenophon (or Xenephon) was a governor of Britannia Inferior, a province of Roman Britain around AD 223. He is named on two milestones with nearly identical texts, which can be dated to that year. He succeeded Marius Valerianus, whose rule is attested in AD 222; and his governorship must have ended by AD 225, when another governor is mentioned in a fragmentary inscription, which only provides part of the name (Maximus). He is also mentioned in inscriptions in Vindolanda and perhaps at Chesters.

References

Further reading
A.R. Birley, The Roman Government of Britain (Oxford:OUP) 2005
E. Groag & R. Stein (edd.) Prosopographia Imperii Romani Saec.I.II.III II (Berlin:de Gruyter) 1936

Roman governors of Britain
Ancient Romans in Britain
3rd-century Romans